In the mathematical field of complex analysis, the Looman–Menchoff theorem states that a continuous complex-valued function defined in an open set of the complex plane is holomorphic if and only if it satisfies the Cauchy–Riemann equations.  It is thus a generalization of a theorem by Édouard Goursat, which instead of assuming the continuity of f, assumes its Fréchet differentiability when regarded as a function from a subset of R2 to R2.

A complete statement of the theorem is as follows:

 Let Ω be an open set in C and f : Ω → C be a continuous function.  Suppose that the partial derivatives  and  exist everywhere but a countable set in Ω.  Then f is holomorphic if and only if it satisfies the Cauchy–Riemann equation:

Examples

Looman pointed out that the function given by f(z) = exp(−z−4) for z ≠ 0, f(0) = 0 satisfies the Cauchy–Riemann equations everywhere but is not analytic (or even continuous) at z = 0. This shows that the function f must be assumed continuous in the theorem.

The function given by f(z) = z5/|z|4 for z ≠ 0, f(0) = 0 is continuous everywhere and satisfies the Cauchy–Riemann equations at z = 0, but is not analytic at z = 0 (or anywhere else). This shows that a naive generalization of the Looman–Menchoff theorem to a single point is false:

 Let f be continuous at a neighborhood of a point z, and such that  and  exist at z.  Then f is holomorphic at z if and only if it satisfies the Cauchy–Riemann equation at z.

References
.
.
.
.
.

Theorems in complex analysis